Peacetime is the eighth studio album by Eddi Reader released in the UK on 29 January 2007.

The album was promoted the following month by a full UK tour with her own band including John McCusker, Boo Hewerdine, Kevin McGuire, Alan Kelly and Roy Dodds.

Eddi says the album started with a desire to work with some of the UK's amazing traditional folk musicians and some contemporary players who she considers the best in their field. "They are free from the normal music business eccentricities and attitude that I associate with the pop industry," she explains.

"They are like old New Orleans jazz players in their lack of ego and interest in making a complete sound with whoever is in the room."
"I wanted to inject some soul into some of the old songs. I wanted to record, play with them like they were brand new, revealing the heart within them."

She also has written some new songs: "I wanted to hear what these musicians would do with them; I was inviting them into my world as I stepped into theirs. As a result the modern songs have a real traditional thread going through them, making it all hopefully ... just music not labelled folk or contemporary or singer-songwriter or jazz!"

Track listing

"Baron's Heir and Sadenia's Air" (John McCusker) - 4:25
"Muddy Water" (Boo Hewerdine) - 3:34
"Mary and the Soldier" (Traditional) - 3:36
"Aye Waukin-O" (Traditional) - 4:03
"Prisons" (John Douglas) - 2:38
"The Shepherd's Song" (Traditional; lyrics by Eddi Reader and John Douglas) - 3:36
"Ye Banks and Braes O' Bonnie Doon" (Robert Burns) - 3:35
"Should I Pray?" (John Douglas) - 3:17
"The Afton" (Johnny Dillon) - 4:37
"Leezie Lindsay" (Traditional, Robert Burns, Eddi Reader, Boo Hewerdine) - 4:46
"Safe As Houses" (Eddi Reader, Boo Hewerdine) - 3:52
"Galileo (Someone Like You)" (Declan O'Rourke) - 3:10
"Peacetime" (Boo Hewerdine) - 7:40
"The Calton Weaver or Nancy Whisky" (Traditional) - hidden bonus track

Personnel
Eddi Reader - vocals, guitar
John McCusker - fiddle, cittern, piano, tenor guitar, keyboards
Boo Hewerdine - guitars
Ian Carr - guitars
John Douglas - guitars, backing vocals
Roy Dodds - drums, percussion
Ewen Vernal - double bass
Kevin McGuire - double bass
Alan Kelly - accordion
Michael McGoldrick - flute, whistles, pipes

2007 albums
Rough Trade Records albums